Vampire hunter or vampire slayer is a fictional occupation in history and fiction which specializes in finding vampires, and sometimes other supernatural creatures. A vampire hunter is usually described as having extensive knowledge of vampires and other monstrous or undead creatures, including their powers and weaknesses, and uses this knowledge to effectively combat them. 

Vampire hunters range in characterization in fiction from sages with more than average knowledge about the occult, to athletes with the skill and ability to confront vampires with traditional or holy weapons often including wooden stakes and holy water, to supernatural beings themselves who fight vampires with mystical powers.  Many characterizations draw from the history and folklore of the Balkans.

A well known and influential archetypal vampire hunter is Professor Abraham Van Helsing, a character in Bram Stoker's 1897 horror novel, Dracula, a foundational work in the genre.

In history
Professional or semi-professional vampire hunters played some part in the vampire beliefs of the Balkans (especially in Bulgarian, Serbian, and Romanian folk beliefs). In Bulgarian, the terms used to designate them included glog (lit. "hawthorn", the species of wood used for the stake), vampirdzhiya, vampirar, dzhadazhiya, svetocher.

They were usually either born on Saturday (then called Sabbatarians, Bulgarian sâbotnichav, Greek sabbatianoí) or the offspring of a vampire and a woman (typically his widow), called a dhampir in Romanian or a vampirović in Serbian. It was also believed that someone born on a Saturday could see a vampire when it was otherwise invisible (and sometimes other supernatural entities as well); similarly for the dhampir. In the case of the Sabbatarians, it was believed in some places that they needed to be fed meat from a sheep killed by a wolf (Bulgarian vâlkoedene); this would enable them not to fear the things that only they were able to see. In Croatian and Slovenian legends, the villages had their own Vampire hunters that were called kresniks, whose spirits were able to turn into animals at night to fight off the vampire or kudlak.
  
Some carried a kit that used mallet, stake, and crucifix. If part of a church, it included holy water, holy oil, etc. However, the most important things it carried were items such as rope, crowbars, or even pistols.

In fiction
The vampire hunter has found new popularity in modern fiction and popular culture.

The most widely known example of a vampire hunter is Abraham Van Helsing of the novel Dracula and in other works of fiction adapting or modifying that work. Other more recent figures include Buffy "the Vampire Slayer" Summers from the television show and film of the same name. Buffy's spin-off series Angel is also focused on a vampire hunter, the titular star, Angel, a vampire himself cursed with a conscience, is often portrayed battling vampires as well as other demons. Created by Marv Wolfman, Marvel Comics character Blade is a half human/half vampire who uses his super strength and agility to hunt vampires and other monsters. The character spawned a 1998 film adaption which developed into a franchise. Vampire hunters have also appeared in video games, such as Castlevania (the occupation of the famed Belmont lineage), and The Elder Scrolls (with factions such as the Dawnguard).

As well as being knowledgeable about vampire lore, vampire hunters in fiction are often armed with an eclectic mix of items and weapons which are designed to take maximum advantage of the monster's traditional weaknesses. These have included firearms with silver ammunition, appropriate religious symbols, crossbows that fire all wood bolts and even waterguns filled with blessed holy water in the movies The Lost Boys and From Dusk Till Dawn.

The organizational strength of depicted vampire hunters can vary wildly. Most hunter characters are in small groups working alone and in secret. By contrast, the Hellsing Organization in the anime television series, Hellsing is a British government paramilitary strike force with access to troops, heavy combat vehicles and weapons and even allied vampires.

While predominantly depicted as human, examples of other types of vampire hunters also exist. Dhampiric figures, having a mix of human and vampire blood, are a popular form. Alucard from the Castlevania series, and the eponymous hero of the Blade series of comic books, movies, television series, and anime, are both examples of dhampir vampire hunters. Even rarer are vampire hunters that are vampires themselves. Two examples of this type can be found in Morbius from Ultimate Spider-Man, and Zero Kiryuu in the manga and anime series Vampire Knight.

The image of the vampire hunter is often a mysterious and dramatic avenging hero, an eccentric extremist, a mad scientist, or sometimes a mix of these. A hunter may be a heroic figure, a villain (from the perspective of the vampire), a lonesome avenger, or sometimes, although not usually, a bounty-hunter-style character, hunting vampires for profit. Vampire hunters have also popularly been depicted as hunting various creatures such as werewolves, demons, and other forms of undead as well. Others have been depicted as mages and cyborgs. Vampire hunters are often associated with or members of the clergy, holy orders, or other religious organizations which may be dedicated to fighting vampires, other demons, and other supernatural forces. Vampire hunting as a family tradition or birthright is a popular use of the archetype in fiction, such as the Belmont family from the Castlevania series. Some hunters devote their entire lives to the eradication of vampires; for others it is just a strange hobby. They can also sometimes be members of law enforcement or government agencies.

The job comes with the risk of getting bitten and the hunters turned into vampires themselves. More often than not fellow hunters, usually do mercy killing to prevent them from becoming monsters, though in some fiction it may be possible for a hunter to cure themselves (and others) of vampirism, especially if the person in question was recently turned into a vampire. Another common trope is hunters being forced to slay their loved ones or allies who have been turned into vampires. Alternatively, after becoming a vampire, sometimes hunters will continue to fight and hunt vampires using their newly acquired vampire powers and abilities (sometimes being hunted by their former allies and other human vampire hunters). In addition to human hunters, dhampirs, and vampires that hunt other vampires, it is not uncommon for vampire hunters to be other supernatural creatures such as werewolves or witches. Additionally, some human hunters may possess holy powers, superhuman, or other supernatural abilities that they can use both to fight and protect themselves from vampires and other supernatural entities they hunt. Some hunters may even resort to using dark powers or weapons (usually dark magic or demonic in nature). Some human hunters may even be tempted to become vampires themselves in order to obtain their powers and immortality, either to continue hunting them, due to fear of their own mortality, or simply a lust for power.

References

Bibliography
 
 

hunters
 
Hunters by game
Obsolete occupations